Pijanów  is a village in the administrative district of Gmina Słupia Konecka, within Końskie County, Świętokrzyskie Voivodeship, in south-central Poland.

The village has a population of 180.

References

Villages in Końskie County
Radom Governorate
Kielce Voivodeship (1919–1939)
Łódź Voivodeship (1919–1939)